The 1999 Open Gaz de France doubles was the doubles event of the seventh edition of the Open GDF Suez; a WTA Tier II tournament held in Paris, France. Sabine Appelmans and Miriam Oremans were the defending champions but lost in the first round to Elena Likhovtseva and Ai Sugiyama.

Irina Spîrlea and Caroline Vis won in the final 7–5, 3–6, 6–3 against Likhovtseva and Sugiyama.

Seeds

Draw

Qualifying

External links
 1999 Open Gaz de France Doubles Draw

Open GDF Suez
Open Gaz de France